Çukurtaş is a village in the Kâhta District, Adıyaman Province, Turkey. The village is populated by Kurds of the Îzol tribe and had a population of 305 in 2021.

The hamlets of Kazanlı and Kovalı are attached to the village.

References

Villages in Kâhta District
Kurdish settlements in Adıyaman Province